Events in the year 1923 in Spain.

Incumbents
Monarch: Alfonso XIII
President of the Council of Ministers: Manuel García Prieto (until 15 September), Miguel Primo de Rivera (starting 15 September)

Events
29 April – In the general election to elect members to all 409 seats in the Congress of Deputies, the Liberals take power from the Conservatives in accordance with the turno system.
23 August – Real Club Celta de Vigo is founded by the joining of Real Fortuna and Sporting de Vigo.
13 September – Miguel Primo de Rivera overthrows Spain's parliamentary government, and establishes himself as dictator.

Births
21 January – Lola Flores, singer, dancer and actress (died 1995)
1 November – Victoria de los Ángeles, operatic soprano (died 2005)
2 November – Emilio el Moro, flamenco singer, guitarist and humorist (died 1987)
13 December – Antoni Tàpies, painter, sculptor and art theorist (died 2012)

Deaths
10 August – Joaquín Sorolla, painter (born 1863)

References

 
Years of the 20th century in Spain
1920s in Spain
Spain
Spain